The Washington Boulevard Bridge is a bridge that spans the Chicago River in downtown Chicago, Illinois, United States.

References

External links
 

1913 establishments in Illinois
Bascule bridges in the United States
Bridges completed in 1913
Bridges in Chicago
Metal bridges in the United States
Road bridges in Illinois